The 32nd European Women's Artistic Gymnastics Championships were held from 2 to 5 August 2018 at the SSE Hydro in Glasgow, Scotland, United Kingdom.

Competition schedule

Medal summary

Medalists

Medal table

Combined

Seniors

Juniors

Senior

Team competition 
Belgium withdrew before the competition to preserve their gymnasts' health for individual event finals. They were replaced by first reserve Italy.

Oldest and youngest competitors

Vault 
Oldest and youngest competitors

Uneven bars 
Oldest and youngest competitors

Balance beam 
Oldest and youngest competitors

Floor 
Oldest and youngest competitor

Junior

Team competition 
Oldest and youngest competitors

Individual all-around 
Oldest and youngest competitors

Vault 
Oldest and youngest competitors

Uneven bars 
Oldest and youngest competitors

Balance beam 
Oldest and youngest competitors

Floor 
Oldest and youngest competitors

Qualification

Senior

Team Competition

Vault

Uneven bars

Balance beam

Floor

Junior

Vault

Uneven bars

Balance beam

Floor

Participating countries

Overall medal table

See also
 2018 European Men's Artistic Gymnastics Championships

References

External links 
 
 European Championships: Artistic Gymnastics 
 Results book − Artistic Gymnastics Women 
 2018 European Artistic Gymnastics Championships Women (GymnasticsResults.com)

European Artistic Gymnastics Championships
European Artistic Gymnastics Championships
Gymnastics
European Artistic Gymnastics Championships (women)
Artistic
Gymnastics in Scotland
International sports competitions in Glasgow
2018 in women's gymnastics